NPSL may refer to:
National Premier Soccer League, an American semi-professional soccer league established in 2003
National Professional Soccer League (1967), an American outdoor soccer league active in 1967
National Professional Soccer League (1984–2001), an American indoor soccer league active from 1984 to 2001
National Professional Soccer League (South Africa), a South African soccer league active from 1971 to 1995